Carenum viridicolor is a species of ground beetle in the subfamily Scaritinae. It was described by Sloane in 1895.

References

viridicolor
Beetles described in 1895